Blastobasis dyssema is a moth in the  family Blastobasidae. It was described by Turner in 1918. It is found on Lord Howe Island.

References

Natural History Museum Lepidoptera generic names catalog

Blastobasis
Moths described in 1918